BlazBlue: Clone Phantasma, released in Japan as , is a 2012 3D arena fighting video game developed by Arc System Works, released as an eShop application for the Nintendo 3DS. It is the sequel to BlayzBloo: Super Melee Brawlers Battle Royale. The game was released in Japan on December 26, 2012 and North America on August 21, 2014.

Characters
Ragna the Bloodedge
Jin Kisaragi
Noel Vermillion
Rachel Alucard
Taokaka
Bang Shishigami
Hazama
Makoto Nanaya
Platinum the Trinity
Izayoi

Reception 

The game received “generally unfavorable reviews” according to the review aggregator Metacritic. Hardcore Gamer gave the game a 2/5, saying "Unless you love BlazBlue and short-burst, super basic brawlers enough to drop $5.99, this will be far too superficial an endeavor to warrant a purchase."

References

External links
Official website for Japan 

2012 video games
Arc System Works games
BlazBlue
Fighting games
Nintendo 3DS eShop games
Nintendo 3DS-only games
Nintendo 3DS games
Multiplayer and single-player video games
Video games about cloning
Video games developed in Japan